Au Rocher de Cancale is a restaurant located in the 2nd arrondissement of Paris, France. It was very popular in the 19th century thanks to its suppers offered after theatre and opera shows.

History 

The restaurant was founded in 1804 by Alexis Balaine. It offered oyster specialities after spectacles. Dandies, Lorettes, aristocrats and Jockey Club used to meet at this restaurant, then located at 59 Rue Montorgueil. At the time, the restaurant offered an extensive list of dishes: 10 mutton, 17 veal, 11 beef and 22 poultry starters, 27 entremets and 30 desserts.

In 1809, La Reynière installed its tasting jury in the restaurant.

Honoré de Balzac, Alexandre Dumas, Théophile Gautier and Eugène Sue were patrons of the restaurant.

In 1837, chef Langlais created the "Norman sole" in Le Rocher de Cancale'''s kitchen.

Balaine's successor, Pierre Frédéric Borrel, went bankrupt and closed the establishment in 1846. The restaurant was latered re-opened under the same name at Rue de Richelieu.

Mr Pécune then moved the restaurant back to Rue Montorgueil (to No. 78). The work Rocher de Cancale is still in the building, as well as frescoes made by Paul Gavarni.

The building was classified as an official Historical Monument on March 3, 1977.

A building of the same name existed in Brussels in 1874.

 In popular culture 
In Honoré de Balzac's La Comédie humaine, characters Henri de Marsay, Madame du Val-Noble, Coralie, Lucien de Rubempré, Étienne Lousteau and Dinah de La Baudraye were regular patrons of the restaurant. The restaurant is notably cited in Le Cabinet des Antiques, La Muse du département, Illusions perdues, Splendeurs et misères des courtisanes'' and other works.

References

Bibliography 

Restaurants in Paris
French restaurants in France
Buildings and structures in the 2nd arrondissement of Paris
1804 establishments
Monuments historiques of Paris